Lážovice is a municipality and village in Beroun District in the Central Bohemian Region of the Czech Republic. It has about 100 inhabitants.

Administrative parts
The village of Nové Dvory is an administrative part of Lážovice.

References

Villages in the Beroun District